The Custodian of Enemy Property is an institution that handles property claims created by war. In wartime, civilian property may be left behind or taken by the occupying state. In ancient times, such property was considered war loot, and the legal right of the winner. In the Fourth Geneva Convention Article 147, such action is defined as war crime:

Custodian of Enemy Property laws
The following list is incomplete.

Bangladesh: The Enemy Property Act was established to manage property of enemies (Indians) taken while it was part of Pakistan (1948–1971) or during its independence war (1971).

Canada The Office of the Custodian of Enemy Property was established in 1916 and existed until 1985, dealing with the property of Canada's enemies in both World Wars as well as the seized property of Japanese Canadians.

India: The Custodian for Enemy Property for India was established to manage Pakistani property taken in the Second Kashmir War (1965).

Israel: The Absentees' Property Laws established the Office of the Israeli Custodian of Absentee Property to manage the property of absentee Palestinian refugees (including refugees who later became citizens of Israel, called "present absentees") of the 1948 Arab–Israeli War (1948). During the Six-Day War (1967), along with previously Palestinian properties, Israel took control of the Jewish property held by the Jordanian Custodian for Enemy Property and put it under the control of their own Custodian of Absentee Property. Most of this property remains under the Custodian, while some (as in the Sheikh Jarrah case) has been granted to Jews contesting ownership, after claiming it in court.

Jordan: The Jordanian Custodian of Enemy Property was established to handle property taken from Jews in the West Bank taken in the 1948 Arab–Israeli War (1948). In 1967, this function was disbanded (see above).

United Kingdom: Custodian of Enemy Property. Previously under the Trading with the Enemy Act 1914 enemy property was inspected by the Board of Trade and ownership was transferred to the Public Trustee. Initially, the Public Trustee held ownership on trust for the enemy but after a 1916 amendment the Public Trustee was required to sell the assets and hold the proceeds in trust. Under the Trading with the Enemy Act 1939, three custodians were established: England and Wales, Scotland, Northern Ireland. Custodians were also appointed in respect of British Dependent Territories.

United States: The Office of Alien Property Custodian was an office within the United States federal government during World War I and again during World War II.

References

Military occupation
Law of war
Economic warfare